The Federal Law Enforcement Training Centers (FLETC) serves as an interagency law enforcement training body for 105 United States government federal law enforcement agencies. The stated mission of FLETC is to "...train those who protect our homeland" (the United States). It also provides training to state, local, campus, tribal, and international law enforcement agencies. Through the Rural Policing Institute (RPI) and the Office of State and Local Training, it provides tuition-free and low-cost training to state, local, campus and tribal law enforcement agencies.

History

Studies conducted in the late 1960s revealed an urgent need for training by professional instructors using modern training facilities and standardized course content. Congress  authorized funds for planning and constructing the Consolidated Federal Law Enforcement Training Center (CFLETC). In 1970, the CFLETC was established as a bureau of the U.S. Department of the Treasury (Treasury Order #217) and began training operations in temporary facilities in Washington, D.C.

The permanent location of the  center was originally planned for the Washington, D.C., area. However, a three-year construction delay resulted in Congress requesting that surplus federal installations be surveyed to determine if one could serve as the permanent site. In May 1975, after a  review of existing facilities, the former Naval Air Station Glynco was selected. In the summer of 1975, the newly renamed Federal Law Enforcement Training Center (FLETC) relocated from Washington, D.C., and began training in September of that year at Glynco, Georgia. Glynco is the headquarters site and main campus for the FLETC and houses the senior leadership of the organization.

On March 1, 2003, FLETC formally transferred from the Treasury Department to the newly established U.S. Department of Homeland Security (DHS), along with some 22 other federal agencies and entities. The move reflected the centrality of the FLETC's mission in support of the unified homeland security effort.

Headquarters
The FLETC headquarters are at the former Naval Air Station Glynco in the Glynco area of unincorporated Glynn County, Georgia, near the port city of Brunswick, Georgia, and about halfway between Savannah, Georgia, and Jacksonville, Florida. Additionally, it operates two other residential training sites at Artesia, New Mexico, and in Charleston, South Carolina. It also operates an in-service re-qualification training facility in Cheltenham, Maryland, for use by agencies with large concentrations of personnel in the Washington, D.C., area. The FLETC Orlando team located at Naval Air Warfare Center Training Systems Division in Orlando, Florida trains with branches of the United States Armed Forces evaluating new and existing training technologies for their ability to meet law enforcement training needs. The Los Angeles Regional Maritime Law Enforcement Training Center in Los Angeles, California has worked a partnership with FLETC along with the Los Angeles County Sheriff's Department along with state and local agencies to develop comprehensive maritime training. FLETC has oversight and program management responsibilities for the International Law Enforcement Academies (ILEA) in Gaborone, Botswana, San Salvador, El Salvador, and Lima, Peru. It also supports training at ILEAs in Budapest, Hungary, and Bangkok, Thailand.

Parent department
The FLETC's parent department, the DHS, supervises its administrative and financial activities. As an interagency training organization, FLETC has professionals from diverse backgrounds to serve on its faculty and staff. Approximately one-third of the instructor staff are permanent FLETC employees. The remainder are federal officers and investigators on short-term assignment from their parent organizations. Agencies take part in curriculum review and development conferences and help develop policies and directives.

Affiliations

Partner organizations have input regarding training issues and functional aspects of the Center. The current partner organizations are:

Administrative Office of the United States Courts
U.S. Probation and Pretrial Services System
Amtrak (National Railroad Passenger Corporation)
Office of Inspector General
Police Department
Central Intelligence Agency
Office of Investigations
Office of Security
Police
Conservation Law Enforcement Consortium
Corporation for National and Community Service, Office of Inspector General
Department of Agriculture
Animal Plant Health Inspection Services
Food Safety Inspection Service
Office of the Inspector General
United States Forest Service
Department of Commerce
Bureau of Industry and Security, Office of Export Enforcement
National Institute of Standards and Technology
National Oceanic and Atmospheric Administration
National Marine Fisheries Service
Department of Defense
Department of the Air Force
United States Air Force Office of Special Investigations
Department of the Army
Army Criminal Investigation Command
Army Counterintelligence Command
Department of the Navy
Commander, Navy Installations Command
Naval Criminal Investigative Service
Defense Intelligence Agency
Defense Logistics Agency
National Geospatial-Intelligence Agency
National Security Agency
Office of Inspector General
Defense Criminal Investigative Service
Pentagon Force Protection Agency
Department of Education
 Office of the Inspector General
Department of Energy
National Nuclear Security Administration - Office of Secure Transportation
Office of Health, Safety and Security
Office of Inspector General
Department of Health and Human Services
Center for Disease Control and Prevention – Office of Safety, Security and Asset Management
Food and Drug Administration - Office of Criminal Investigations
National Institute of Health
Office of the Inspector General
Department of Homeland Security
Customs and Border Protection
United States Border Patrol
Immigration & Customs Enforcement
Enforcement and Removal Operations
Federal Emergency Management Agency - Office of Security
Federal Protective Service
Homeland Security Investigations
Intelligence Analysis Operations
Office of Inspector General
Office of Professional Responsibility
Transportation Security Administration
Federal Air Marshal Service
United States Secret Service
United States Citizenship and Immigration Services
United States Coast Guard
Coast Guard Investigative Service
Marine Law Enforcement Academy
Department of Housing and Urban Development
Office of the Inspector General
Protective Services Division
Department of Interior
Bureau of Indian Affairs
Bureau of Land Management
Bureau of Reclamation
Office of Inspector General
Office of Law Enforcement and Security
Office of Surface Mining Reclamation and Enforcement
National Park Service
United States Park Police
United States Park Rangers
United States Fish and Wildlife Service
Law Enforcement
Refuge
Department of Justice
Bureau of Alcohol, Tobacco, Firearms and Explosives
Federal Bureau of Prisons
Office of the Inspector General
United States Marshals Service
Department of Labor
Office of Inspector General
Office of Labor-Management Standards
Department of State
Diplomatic Security Service
Office of Inspector General
United States Agency for International Development - Office of Inspector General
Department of Transportation
Office of Inspector General
Federal Aviation Administration
Department of the Treasury
Bureau of Engraving and Printing
Financial Crimes Enforcement Network
Internal Revenue Service, Criminal Investigation
Office of Terrorism and Financial Intelligence - Office of Foreign Assets Control
Office of the Inspector General
Treasury Inspector General for Tax Administration
United States Mint
United States Mint Police
Department of Veterans Affairs
Law Enforcement Training Center
Office of the Inspector General
Environmental Protection Agency
Criminal Investigation Division
Office of the Inspector General
Federal Deposit Insurance Corporation - Office of the Inspector General
Federal Reserve System
General Services Administration - Office of the Inspector General
Government Publishing Office
Office of the Inspector General
Security Services
National Aeronautics and Space Administration - Office of the Inspector General
Nuclear Regulatory Commission
 Office of the Inspector General
Office of Personnel Management
 Office of the Inspector General
Railroad Retirement Board - Office of the Inspector General
Small Business Administration
Office of the Inspector General
Smithsonian Institution
National Zoological Park Police
Office of Protective Services
Social Security Administration
 Office of the Inspector General
Tennessee Valley Authority
Office of the Inspector General
Police Department
United States Capitol Police
United States Postal Service 
Office of the Inspector General
United States Supreme Court Police

See also
 FBI Academy

References

 Attribution

Further reading

 Public Manager. Spring 2013, Vol. 42, Issue 1, pp. 15–19.
 Vital Speeches of the Day. December 2010, Vol. 76, Issue 12, pp. 556–558.
 Journal of Applied Security Research. 2012, Vol. 7 Issue 4, pp. 478–488.
 U.S. News Digital Weekly. 4/4/2014, Vol. 6 Issue 14, pp. 15.

External links

 
 

1970 establishments in Georgia (U.S. state)
Brunswick, Georgia
Education in Glynn County, Georgia
Federal police academies in the United States
Glynn County, Georgia
Government agencies established in 1970
Shooting ranges in the United States
United States Department of Homeland Security